Michael's is an American restaurant located in Santa Monica, California that was opened in 1979 by restaurateur Michael McCarty.

A second Michael's location was opened at 24 West 55th Street in New York City in 1989.

Michael’s is known for manny firsts: chefs that were young, American and college educated; waiters dressed in Calvin Klein; artwork from the likes of Jasper Johns and David Hockney and computer software to track sales and supplies.

Alumni of the kitchen include Jonathan Waxman, Mark Peel, Nancy Silverton, and Sang Yoon.

References

External links

After Hours episode with Michael McCarty

Restaurants in Greater Los Angeles
Companies based in Santa Monica, California
Restaurants established in 1979
1979 establishments in California
Restaurants in Manhattan